Thomas Forsyth may refer to:

 Thomas Forsyth (footballer) (1892–?), Scottish amateur footballer
 Thomas Forsyth (Indian agent) (1771–1833), American frontiersman, trader, and Indian agent
 Thomas Forsyth (New Zealand politician) (1868–1941), New Zealand Member of Parliament
 Thomas Douglas Forsyth (1827–1886), Anglo-Indian administrator and diplomat
 Thomas H. Forsyth (1842–1908), American soldier and Medal of Honor recipient
 Tom Forsyth (1949–2020), Scottish football player and manager

See also 
 Tom Forsythe, American artist and Tai Chi instructor
Thomas Forsyth House in Utah, USA